The Shire of Stawell was a local government area about  west-northwest of Melbourne, the state capital of Victoria, Australia.

Stawell itself was managed by a separate entity; the City of Stawell.

History

Stawell was first incorporated as a road district on 29 January 1861, and became a shire on 30 December 1864. On 26 October 1926, it annexed part of the North Riding of the Shire of Ararat.

On 20 January 1995, the Shire of Stawell was abolished, and along with the City of Stawell, the Town of St Arnaud, parts of the Shires of Ararat, Avoca, Donald, Kara Kara, Dunmunkle and the Grampians National Park section of the Shire of Wimmera, was merged into the newly created Shire of Northern Grampians. The Armstrong district was transferred into the Rural City of Ararat.

Wards

The Shire of Stawell was divided into four ridings, each of which elected three councillors:
 North Riding
 East Riding
 West Riding
 North-East Riding

Towns and localities
 Armstrong
 Bellfield
 Callawadda
 Campbells Bridge
 Deep Lead
 Concongella
 Glenorchy
 Great Western
 Greens Creek
 Halls Gap
 Illawarra
 Kanya
 Lake Fyans
 Landsborough
 Ledcourt
 Marnoo
 Wallaloo

Population

* Estimate in the 1958 Victorian Year Book.
# 1981 census says 2,306 for 1976.

See also
 List of mayors of Stawell

References

External links
 Victorian Places - Stawell

Stawell
1861 establishments in Australia